(abbreviation:TFM) is a radio station in Chiyoda, Tokyo, Japan. It is the flagship station of the Japan FM Network (JFN).

Timeline
The station's forerunner, FM Tokai, owned by Tokai University, was launched on May 1, 1960. This station closed on April 25, 1970, replaced the next day by Tokyo FM, Japan's third commercial FM-radio broadcaster, after FM Aichi and FM Osaka. In 1985, the station's headquarters moved from the Kokusai-Tsushin Center (later KDD, now KDDI) buildings in Nishi-Shinjuku, where they had been since 1974, to the current location, Koujimachi in Chiyoda ward. The TOKYO FM Midtown Studio, a satellite studio, was closed down on January 15, 2017.

Broadcasting
JOAU-FM
Frequency: 80.0 MHz (Tokyo Tower)

Program

Countdown Station (simulcast over all JFN Stations)
 Zen-Noh presents Countdown jp
 cosmo Pops Best 10
 McDonald's SOUND IN MY LIFE
Tatsuro Yamashita presents Rakuten card Sunday Song Book
Suzuki Talking FM (hosted by Masaharu Fukuyama)
morinaga presents Ayaka Hirahara Healing Venus (simulcast over FM OSAKA and FM AICHI(@fm))
Atsuko Maeda's Heart Songs
School of Lock! (simulcast over all JFN Stations)

Website

References

Mass media companies based in Tokyo
Radio stations in Japan
Radio stations established in 1970
Chiyoda, Tokyo
1970 establishments in Japan